Kinh Dương Vương (Hán tự: 涇陽王; "King of Kinh Dương") is a legendary ancient Vietnamese figure, mentioned in the 15th-century work Đại Việt sử ký toàn thư by having unified all the tribes within his territory into one state, and as the founder of the Hồng Bàng dynasty. He is considered the first sovereign of the Vietnamese people, and was the father of Lạc Long Quân. He is reported to have lived 260 years and his son is reported to have lived for 506 years.

Kinh Dương Vương's personal name was Lộc Tục (Hán tự: 祿續). According to the 15th-century Đại Việt sử ký toàn thư, he ruled over Xích Quỷ (赤鬼, later renamed Văn Lang) starting in 2879 BC. Kinh Dương Vương's father was Đế Minh (帝明, "Emperor Ming" of Chinese and Vietnamese mythology), the descendant of Thần Nông. His mother was Vụ Tiên Nữ (婺僊女, lit. "Beautiful Immortal Lady, Beautiful Goddess").  Kinh Dương Vương married Thần Long, who was the daughter of Động Đình Quân (Lord of Dongting) and mother of Kinh Dương Vương's successor Lạc Long Quân.

Today Kinh Dương Vương features with other legendary figures such as Thánh Gióng, Âu Cơ, Sơn Tinh and Thủy Tinh, in elementary school texts. A popular shrine, and presumed tomb of Kinh Dương Vương, is located in the village of An Lữ, Thuận Thành District, Bắc Ninh Province .

Legends
According to Đại Việt sử ký toàn thư, a book written in a Confucian perspective, Kinh Dương Vương originates from China: Emperor Ming, the great-great-grandson of the mythological Chinese ruler Shennong, went on a tour of inspection south of the Nanling Mountains, settled down and married a certain Beautiful Immortal Lady (鶩僊女 Vụ Tiên Nữ), who then gave birth to an intelligent son named Lộc Tục (祿續).

After Emperor Ming passed the throne to his eldest son, Emperor Ly(釐) to be king of the North, and Lộc Tục was appointed to be king of the South, his title Kinh Dương Vương (涇陽王). Kinh Duong Vuong was king and ruled from about 2879 BC onwards. The territory of the country under Kinh Dương Vương was claimed to be large, reaching Dongting Lake in the north, the Husunxing (胡猻精; SV: Hồ Tôn Tinh) country (i.e. Champa) in the south, the East Sea (東海, part of the Pacific Ocean) in the east and Ba Shu (巴蜀; now in today Sichuan, China) in the west. Lĩnh Nam chích quái recorded the legend that the king vigorously expelled a murderous god named Xương Cuồng.
He married the daughter of the King of Động Đình (洞庭) Lake, named Thần Long (神龍 "Divine Dragon"), who gave birth to a son named Sùng Lãm (崇纜). Sùng Lãm would later succeed Kinh Dương Vương as ruler, titled Dragon Lord of Lạc (貉龍君; SV: Lạc Long Quân).

Worship
Worship of Kinh Dương Vương in Vietnam is not as popular as worship of Shennong, the deity  who is Hùng Vương's ancestor and a very respected one in Vietnam's agricultural beliefs; Đàn Xã Tắc(壇社稷) was established annually by feudal dynasties to worship  .

Thượng Lãng communal house in Minh Hòa commune, Hưng Hà district, Thái Bình province is the oldest relic worshiping Kinh Dương Vương; Legend has it since the Đinh dynasty .

The Kinh Dương Vương Mausoleum and Temple (locally called Lăng và Đền thờ) in Bắc Ninh have long been classified by the Vietnamese feudal dynasties as shrines to worship the emperors, each time the National Ceremony will bring to the army to worship and worship people solemnly. In 2013 , Bắc Ninh province announced a plan to preserve, embellish and promote the population of national historical and cultural relics of Mausoleum and Kinh Dương Vương Temple with a total investment of more than 491 billion VND. The project is divided into 4 main construction categories, including: relic conservation space, focusing on repairing and embellishing the relics of the Mausoleum and Kinh Dương Vương Temple, temple grounds, tomb gardens; relic value space includes: ancestral monument, cultural festival square, cultural display ... accompanied by ancillary services to develop spiritual cultural tourism, attracting tourists and technical infrastructure, leveling, roads, electricity lines. At present, the Kinh Duong Vuong tomb and temple relic is worshiped in Á Lữ village, Đại Đồng Thành commune, Thuận Thành district, Bắc Ninh province .

Other theories
Many historical researchers suspected that Kinh Dương Vương was a legendary figure based on elements from the novella Story of Liu Yi (柳毅 SV: Liễu Nghị truyện). Historical researcher Trần Trọng Dương pointed out that:

This view has been expressed by many Vietnamese historians since the 18th century: for example, Ngô Thì Sĩ in Prefatory Compilation to Đại Việt's Historical Records

as well as the Nguyễn dynasty's historians in The Imperially Ordered Outlined and Detailed Texts Thoroughly Mirroring of the History of Viet

 

Consequently, Emperor Tự Đức of the Nguyen dynasty decided to exclude King of Kinh Duong and Dragon Lord of Lạc from their historiography as this did not conform with the Confucian ideals of the country.

References

Ancient Vietnam
Vietnamese deities
Vietnamese gods
Vietnamese monarchs
Vietnamese mythology
Legendary progenitors
Legendary monarchs
Founding monarchs
Legendary Vietnamese people